LeRoy S. Wirthlin (born 1935) was a professor at Harvard Medical School and later a practicing surgeon.

Biography 
Wirthlin received his bachelor's degree from the University of Utah and his medical degree from Harvard Medical School.

Wirthlin is a Latter-day Saint.  From 2002 to 2005 he served as president of the Germany Munich Austria Mission of the Church of Jesus Christ of Latter-day Saints.

Wirthlin and his wife Mary are the parents of 17 children.

Writings 
Wirthlin has published papers on high altitude effects and also on the surgeries performed on Joseph Smith, Jr.  This included an article about Nathan Smith published in the journal BYU Studies in 1977, followed by an article for more general readers in the Ensign magazine.  Wirthlin got involved in the study of Smith's surgery due to interactions with his stake president Richard L. Bushman, who was an expert on Smith's life.

Notes

Sources 
 Scientific Commons entry
 Archives of Surgery article co-authored by Wirthlin
 Wirthlin's BYU studies article
 Mormon Times, Jul 21, 2008

1936 births
21st-century Mormon missionaries
American leaders of the Church of Jesus Christ of Latter-day Saints
American Mormon missionaries in Austria
American surgeons
Harvard Medical School alumni
Harvard Medical School faculty
Historians of the Latter Day Saint movement
Living people
Mission presidents (LDS Church)
American Mormon missionaries in Germany
University of Utah alumni
Latter Day Saints from Michigan